The 2013 AIBA World Boxing Championships were held at the Baluan Sholak Palace of Culture and Sports in Almaty, Kazakhstan from 14 to 26 October 2013.

Results

Medal table

Medal summary

References

External links
 Official website

 
2013
AIBA World Boxing Championships
AIBA World Boxing Championships
Sports competitions in Almaty
International boxing competitions hosted by Kazakhstan
October 2013 sports events in Asia
21st century in Almaty